This is a list of Welsh important historical documents connected to Wales and/or the Welsh language, starting from the early medieval period. These documents are written in various stages of the Welsh language as well as other languages such as Latin.

List

References 

Welsh literature
History of Wales